Rafael Nadal defeated Cameron Norrie in the final, 6–4, 6–4 to win the singles title at the 2022 Mexican Open. Nadal did not drop a set during a tournament for a record-extending 30th time. It was his fourth Acapulco title and 91st career singles title overall.

Alexander Zverev was the defending champion, but he was defaulted from the tournament prior to his second-round match after he showed unsportsmanlike conduct at the conclusion of his first-round doubles match, repeatedly hitting the umpire’s chair with his racquet and using obscene language.

Daniil Medvedev was in contention to claim the world No. 1 singles ranking. After Novak Djokovic lost in the quarterfinals in Dubai, Medvedev clinched the top ranking for the first time, making him the 27th player to hold the position. Medvedev also became the first player outside of the Big Four to hold the world number 1 ranking since Andy Roddick in February 2004, ending the quartet's 943-week streak with the top position.

For the first time since the 2013 China Open, four of the top five ranked players competed at the same ATP 500 tournament.

The first-round match between Zverev and Jenson Brooksby had the latest-ever finish in an ATP Tour match when it ended at 4:55 a.m. local time, passing the previous record of 4:34 a.m. local time set by Lleyton Hewitt and Marcos Baghdatis at the 2008 Australian Open. At three hours and twenty-two minutes, it was also the longest match ever played at the Mexican Open.

Seeds

Draw

Finals

Top half

Bottom half

Qualifying

Seeds

Qualifiers

Lucky losers

Qualifying draw

First qualifier

Second qualifier

Third qualifier

Fourth qualifier

References

External links 
Main draw
Qualifying draw

Abierto Mexicano Telcel - Singles
Men's Singles